Women – for America, for the World is a 1986 American short documentary film directed by Vivienne Verdon-Roe about women anti-nuclear activists. In 1987, it won an Oscar for Documentary Short Subject at the 59th Academy Awards.

Cast
 Joanne Woodward as Herself
 Jean Shinoda Bolen as Herself
 Betty Bumpers as Herself
 Shirley Chisholm as Herself
 Allene Cottier as Herself
 Mary Dent Crisp as Herself
 Geraldine Ferraro as Herself (voice) (as Geraldine Ferraro)
 Ellen Goodman as Herself
 Elisabeth Holtzman as Herself (as Elizabeth Holtzman)
 Vera Kistiakowsky as Herself
 Pat Schroeder as Herself (as Patricia Schroeder)

References

External links

Women – for America, for the World on YouTube, posted by the Ecological Options Network

1986 films
1986 short films
1986 documentary films
1980s short documentary films
1986 independent films
American short documentary films
American independent films
Best Documentary Short Subject Academy Award winners
Documentary films about nuclear war and weapons
Documentary films about women
1980s English-language films
1980s American films